John Murphy, Irish soldier, fl. 1846-48.

Murphy was a native of County Mayo, Ireland who later served with the Saint Patrick's Battalion. He had deserted the U.S. army 8th Infantry on  17 May 1846, and joined the Mexican army. Because the United States had not yet declared war on Mexico at the time of Murphy's desertion, he could not be hung for his actions. Murphy, along with several other members of the battalion received fifty lashes and were branded with the letter D for "deserter" on the cheeks of their faces.  He was held captive by the US army until the war concluded. Upon his release from prison, he received his pay from the Mexican government in May 1848, and settled in Mexico. He is ancestor to the Murphy-Martinez family of Guadalajara, and one of the few documented members of the battalion to have verified descendants in present-day Mexico.

References

 p. 206, no. 23, The Irish Soldiers of Mexico, Michael Hogan, 1998.

External links

 http://drmichaelhogan.com/cms/index.php?option=com_content&task=view&id=22&Itemid=31
 https://www.amazon.com/Irish-Soldiers-Mexico-Michael-Hogan/dp/9687846003
 https://www.amazon.com/The-Rogues-March-Patricks-Battalion/dp/1574887386
 http://latinamericanhistory.about.com/od/Mexican-AmericanWar/a/The-Saint-Patricks-Battalion.htm

Irish soldiers in the United States Army
Military personnel from County Mayo 
19th-century Irish people